The Iran national kabaddi team represents the Islamic Republic of Iran in international kabaddi.

Tournament records
*Red border indicates that the tournament was hosted on home soil. Gold, silver, bronze backgrounds indicates 1st, 2nd and 3rd finishes respectively. Bold text indicates best finish in tournament.

Standard style

Asian Games

World Cup

Other styles

Circle World Cup

Circle Asian Cup

Asian Beach Games

Asian Indoor Games

Dubai Kabaddi Masters

Team

See also
 Sport in Iran

References
 Archive Results

External links
 International Kabaddi Federation
 World Cup 2007 Results
 World cup 2004 Results

Kabaddi
National kabaddi teams
National kabaddi team